Vladimirvoka is a rural locality (a selo) in Starooskolsky District, Belgorod Oblast, Russia. The population was 712 as of 2010. There are 11 streets.

Geography 
Vladimirvoka is located 53 km southeast of Stary Oskol (the district's administrative centre) by road. Vysoky is the nearest rural locality.

References 

Rural localities in Starooskolsky District